True Grit is a 2010 American Western film directed, written, produced, and edited by Joel Coen and Ethan Coen. It is an adaptation of Charles Portis' 1968 novel of the same name, starring Jeff Bridges as Deputy U.S. Marshal Reuben J. "Rooster" Cogburn and Hailee Steinfeld as Mattie Ross. The film also stars Matt Damon, Josh Brolin, and Barry Pepper.
A previous film adaptation in 1969 starred John Wayne, Kim Darby and Glen Campbell.

Fourteen-year-old farm girl Mattie Ross hires Cogburn, a boozy, trigger-happy lawman to go after an outlaw named Tom Chaney who has murdered her father. The bickering duo are accompanied on their quest by a Texas Ranger named LaBoeuf who has been tracking Chaney for killing a State Senator. As the three embark on a dangerous adventure, they each have their "grit" tested in various ways.

Filming began in March 2010, and the film was officially released in the United States on December 22, 2010 after advance screenings earlier that month. The film opened the 61st Berlin International Film Festival on February 10, 2011. It was well received by critics with particular praise to its acting, directing, story, musical score and production values, with some deeming it superior to the original. It was nominated for ten Academy Awards, but won none: Best Picture, Best Director, Best Adapted Screenplay, Best Actor in a Leading Role (Bridges), Best Actress in a Supporting Role (Steinfeld), Best Art Direction, Best Cinematography, Best Costume Design, Best Sound Mixing, and Best Sound Editing. The film was released on Blu-ray and DVD on June 7, 2011.

Plot
While on a trip to Fort Smith, Arkansas, fourteen-year-old Mattie Ross’s father is murdered by hired hand Tom Chaney. Sent to collect her father's body, Mattie asks the local sheriff about the search for Chaney. He tells her that Chaney has likely fled with "Lucky" Ned Pepper and his gang into Indian Territory, where the sheriff has no authority, so she inquires about hiring a Deputy U.S. Marshal. The sheriff gives three recommendations, and Mattie chooses the "meanest" of the three, Rooster Cogburn. Cogburn initially rebuffs her offer, doubting both her grit and her wealth, but she raises the money by aggressive horse-trading.

Texas Ranger LaBoeuf arrives in town, pursuing Chaney for the murder of a Texas State Senator. LaBoeuf proposes joining Cogburn, but Mattie refuses his offer. She wishes Chaney to be hanged in Arkansas for her father's murder, not in Texas for killing the senator. Mattie insists on traveling with Cogburn but he departs without her, having gone with LaBoeuf to apprehend Chaney and split the reward.

After pursuing and catching up to the lawmen, Mattie is spanked for her perceived insolence by LaBoeuf. This, combined with a further disagreement, prompts Cogburn to end his arrangement with LaBoeuf; the latter leaves to pursue Chaney on his own. At a rural dugout, Cogburn and Mattie find two outlaws, Quincy and Moon, who surrender after Cogburn shoots and injures Moon. Initially, the outlaws deny any knowledge of Ned Pepper or Chaney, but Cogburn, using Moon's worsening injury as leverage, convinces Moon to cooperate. Quincy, enraged, stabs Moon and is himself shot and killed by Cogburn. A dying Moon informs Cogburn that Pepper and his gang will arrive at the dugout later that night for supplies.

Cogburn and Mattie plan an ambush for the Pepper gang, but LaBoeuf arrives first and is confronted by the gang. Cogburn shoots two gang members and accidentally hits LaBoeuf, but Pepper escapes. The next morning the three set off again in pursuit of Chaney and the Pepper gang, who Cogburn believes may be hiding out in the Winding Stair Mountains. Cogburn begins to drink heavily, and after several days of searching, the three find no trace of Chaney or the Pepper gang. Cogburn declares that the trail has gone cold and quits the pursuit; LaBoeuf leaves the posse, declaring he will return to Texas.

While retrieving water from a stream, Mattie happens upon Chaney. She shoots and wounds him, but her revolver then misfires, allowing Chaney to take her hostage. Ned Pepper convinces Cogburn to leave the area by threatening to kill Mattie. Pepper leaves Mattie alone with Chaney, ordering him not to harm her. Pepper then departs with the rest of the gang, stating he will return with a fresh horse for Chaney. Chaney, musing that Pepper has abandoned him to be captured by the law, attempts to kill Mattie. LaBoeuf, having rendezvoused with Cogburn, arrives and knocks Chaney unconscious, while Cogburn intercepts the fleeing gang in a four-to-one standoff.

Cogburn and the outlaws charge at each other headlong, with Cogburn killing two of the gang before his own horse is shot and falls, trapping him. As Pepper, mortally wounded, prepares to execute Cogburn, LaBoeuf shoots Pepper from 400 yards with his Sharps rifle. Chaney regains consciousness and knocks out LaBoeuf, but Mattie seizes LaBoeuf's rifle and shoots Chaney in the chest, killing him. The recoil knocks her into a pit, where she is bitten by a rattlesnake. Cogburn arrives and rescues Mattie, promising to send help for LaBoeuf before departing with Mattie to reach a doctor. After their horse collapses from exhaustion, Cogburn carries a delirious Mattie on foot to reach help. Mattie's arm is ultimately amputated, and although Cogburn stays with her until she is out of danger, he is gone by the time she regains consciousness.

Twenty-five years later, Mattie receives a letter from Cogburn inviting her to attend a traveling Wild West show in which he is performing. When she arrives at the show site, she learns that Cogburn died three days earlier. She has his body moved to her family cemetery and stands over the grave, reflecting on this decision, her choice not to marry, and her hope of hearing from LaBoeuf again if he is still alive.

Cast

 Jeff Bridges as Deputy U.S. Marshal Rooster Cogburn
 Hailee Steinfeld as Mattie Ross
 Matt Damon as Texas Ranger LaBoeuf
 Josh Brolin as Tom Chaney
 Barry Pepper as "Lucky" Ned Pepper
 Domhnall Gleeson as Moon (the Kid)
 Bruce Green as Harold Parmalee
 Ed Lee Corbin as Bear Man (Dr. Forrester)
 Roy Lee Jones as Yarnell Poindexter
 Paul Rae as Emmett Quincy
 Nicholas Sadler as Sullivan
 Dakin Matthews as Colonel Stonehill
 Elizabeth Marvel and Ruth Morris as 40-year-old Mattie
 Leon Russom as Sheriff
 Jake Walker as Judge Isaac Charles Parker
 Don Pirl as Cole Younger
 Jarlath Conroy as the Undertaker
 J. K. Simmons as J. Noble Daggett, Mattie's lawyer (voice only)

Adaptation and production
The project was confirmed in March 2009.

Ahead of shooting, Ethan Coen said that the film would be a more faithful adaptation of the novel than the 1969 version.

It's partly a question of point-of-view. The book is entirely in the voice of the 14-year-old girl. That sort of tips the feeling of it over a certain way. I think [the book is] much funnier than the movie was so I think, unfortunately, they lost a lot of humor in both the situations and in her voice. It also ends differently than the movie did. You see the main character – the little girl – 25 years later when she's an adult. Another way in which it's a little bit different from the movie – and maybe this is just because of the time the movie was made – is that it's a lot tougher and more violent than the movie reflects. Which is part of what's interesting about it.

Mattie Ross "is a pill", said Ethan Coen in a December 2010 interview, "but there is something deeply admirable about her in the book that we were drawn to", including the Presbyterian-Protestant ethic so strongly imbued in a 14-year-old girl. Joel Coen said that the brothers did not want to "mess around with what we thought was a very compelling story and character". The film's producer, Scott Rudin, said that the Coens had taken a "formal, reverent approach" to the Western genre, with its emphasis on adventure and quest. "The patois of the characters, the love of language that permeates the whole film, makes it very much of a piece with their other films, but it is the least ironic in many regards".

Nevertheless, there are subtle ways in which the film adaptation differs from the original novel. This is particularly evident in the negotiation scene between Mattie and her father's undertaker. In the film, Mattie bargains over her father's casket and proceeds to spend the night among the corpses to avoid paying for the boardinghouse. This scene is, in fact, nonexistent in the novel, where Mattie is depicted as refusing to bargain over her father's body, and never entertains the thought of sleeping among the corpses.

Open casting sessions were held in Texas in November 2009 for the role of Mattie Ross. The following month, Paramount Pictures announced a casting search for a 12- to 16-year-old girl, describing the character as a "simple, tough as nails young woman" whose "unusually steely nerves and straightforward manner are often surprising". Steinfeld, then age 13, was selected for the role from a pool of 15,000 applicants. "It was, as you can probably imagine, the source of a lot of anxiety", Ethan Coen told The New York Times. "We were aware if the kid doesn't work, there's no movie".

The film was shot in the Santa Fe, New Mexico, area on 22 March and wrapped on 27 April 2010, as well as in Bartlett, Granger and Austin, Texas. The first trailer was released in September; a second trailer premiered with The Social Network.

For the final segment of the film, a one-armed body double was needed for Elizabeth Marvel (who played the adult Mattie). After a nationwide call, the Coen brothers cast Ruth Morris – a 29-year-old social worker and student who was born without a left forearm.

Soundtrack

Reception

Box office

In the holiday weekend following its December 22 North American debut, True Grit took in $25.6 million at the box office, twice its pre-release projections. By its second weekend ending January 2, the film had earned $87.1 million domestically, becoming the Coen brothers' highest-grossing film, surpassing No Country for Old Men, which earned $74.3 million. True Grit was the only mainstream movie of the 2010 holiday season to exceed the revenue expectations of its producers. Based on that performance, The Los Angeles Times predicted that the film would likely become the second-highest grossing western of all time when inflation is discounted, exceeded only by Dances with Wolves. On Thursday, December 23, 2010, it opened to  behind Little Fockers and Tron: Legacy. On Friday, December 24, 2010, it went up to  behind Little Fockers. It stayed  until January 14 and then went down to  behind The Green Hornet and The Dilemma. On February 11, 2011, it went down to  behind Justin Bieber: Never Say Never, Just Go With It, Gnomeo and Juliet, The Eagle, The Roommate, The King's Speech, No Strings Attached, and Sanctum. It closed in theaters on April 28, 2011. True Grit took in an additional $15 million in what is usually a slow month for movie attendance, reaching $110 million. According to Box Office Mojo, True Grit has grossed over $170 million domestically and $250 million worldwide as of July 2011.

Both the brothers and Paramount Vice Chairman Rob Moore attributed the film's success partly to its "soft" PG-13 rating, atypical for a Coen brothers film, which helped broaden audience appeal. Paramount anticipated that the film would be popular with the adults who often constitute the Coen brothers' core audience, as well as fans of the Western genre. But True Grit also drew extended families: parents, grandparents, and teenagers. Geographically, the film played strongest in Los Angeles and New York, but its top 20 markets also included Oklahoma City; Plano, Texas; and Olathe, Kansas.

Critical reception
True Grit received critical acclaim. Roger Ebert awarded 3.5 stars out of 4, writing, "What strikes me is that I'm describing the story and the film as if it were simply, if admirably, a good Western. That's a surprise to me, because this is a film by the Coen Brothers, and this is the first straight genre exercise in their career. It's a loving one. Their craftsmanship is a wonder", and also remarking, "The cinematography by Roger Deakins reminds us of the glory that was, and can still be, the Western."

The Los Angeles Times critic Kenneth Turan gave the film 4 out of 5 stars, writing, "The Coens, not known for softening anything, have restored the original's bleak, elegiac conclusion and as writer-directors have come up with a version that shares events with the first film but is much closer in tone to the book ... Clearly recognizing a kindred spirit in Portis, sharing his love for eccentric characters and odd language, they worked hard, and successfully, at serving the buoyant novel as well as being true to their own black comic brio."

In his review for the Minneapolis Star Tribune Colin Covert wrote: "the Coens dial down the eccentricity and deliver their first classically made, audience-pleasing genre picture. The results are masterful." Richard Corliss of Time named Hailee Steinfeld's performance one of the Top 10 Movie Performances of 2010, saying "She delivers the orotund dialogue as if it were the easiest vernacular, stares down bad guys, wins hearts. That's a true gift".

Rex Reed of the New York Observer criticized the film's pacing, referring to plot points as "mere distractions ... to divert attention from the fact that nothing is going on elsewhere". Reed considers Damon "hopelessly miscast" and finds Bridges' performance mumbly, lumbering, and self-indulgent. Entertainment Weekly gave the movie a B+: "Truer than the John Wayne showpiece and less gritty than the book, this True Grit is just tasty enough to leave movie lovers hungry for a missing spice."

The US Conference of Catholic Bishops review called the film "exceptionally fine" and said "[a]mid its archetypical characters, mythic atmosphere and amusingly idiosyncratic dialogue, writer-directors Joel and Ethan Coen's captivating drama uses its heroine's sensitive perspective – as well as a fair number of biblical and religious references – to reflect seriously on the violent undertow of frontier life".

Rotten Tomatoes reported that 95% of critics gave the film a positive review based on 275 reviews, with an average score of 8.32/10 and with its consensus stating: "Girded by strong performances from Jeff Bridges, Matt Damon, and newcomer Hailee Steinfeld, and lifted by some of the Coens' most finely tuned, unaffected work, True Grit is a worthy companion to the Charles Portis book." Metacritic gave the film an average score of 80 out of 100 based on 41 reviews from mainstream critics, indicating "generally favorable reviews". Audiences polled by CinemaScore gave the film an average grade of "B+" on an A+ to F scale. Total Film gave the film a five-star review (denoting 'outstanding'): "This isn't so much a remake as a masterly re-creation. Not only does it have the drop on the 1969 version, it's the first great movie of 2011".

Accolades

The film won the Broadcast Film Critics Association Award for Best Young Performer (Hailee Steinfeld) and received ten additional nominations in the following categories: Best Film, Best Actor (Jeff Bridges), Best Supporting Actress (Steinfeld), Best Director, Best Adapted Screenplay, Best Cinematography, Best Art Direction, Best Costume Design, Best Makeup, and Best Score. The ceremony took place on January 14, 2011.

It was nominated for two Screen Actors Guild Awards: Best Actor in a Leading Role (Bridges) and Best Actress in a Supporting Role (Steinfeld). The ceremony took place on January 30, 2011.

It was nominated for eight British Academy Film Awards: Best Film, Best Actor in a Leading Role (Bridges), Best Actress in a Leading Role (Steinfeld), Best Adapted Screenplay, Best Cinematography, Best Production Design, Best Costume Design. Roger Deakins won the award for Best Cinematography.

It was nominated for ten Academy Awards, but won none: Best Picture, Best Director, Best Adapted Screenplay, Best Actor (Bridges), Best Supporting Actress (Steinfeld), Best Art Direction, Best Cinematography, Best Costume Design, Best Sound Mixing, and Best Sound Editing. When told of all the nominations, the Coen brothers stated, "Ten seems like an awful lot. We don't want to take anyone else's."

Home media
The film was released on DVD and Blu-ray on June 7, 2011.

References

External links

 
 
 
 
 

2010
2010 Western (genre) films
2010s adventure drama films
American Western (genre) films
American adventure drama films
BAFTA winners (films)
2010s English-language films
Films about death
American films about revenge
Films about Christianity
Films about the Texas Ranger Division
Films based on American novels
Films based on Western (genre) novels
Films directed by the Coen brothers
Films produced by Scott Rudin
Films scored by Carter Burwell
Films set in 1903
Films set in Arkansas
Films set in Oklahoma
Films set in the 1870s
Films shot in New Mexico
Films shot in Texas
Remakes of American films
Paramount Pictures films
Skydance Media films
United States Marshals Service in fiction
2010 drama films
2010 films
Guerrilla warfare in film
2010s American films
Films about capital punishment